Deng Jian (born October 19, 1989 in Shandong) is a Chinese swimmer, who competed for Team China at the 2008 Summer Olympics.

Major achievements
2008 National Champions Tournament - 3rd 200 m back

References
http://2008teamchina.olympic.cn/index.php/personview/personsen/5526

External links
 

1989 births
Living people
Chinese male backstroke swimmers
Olympic swimmers of China
Swimmers at the 2008 Summer Olympics
Swimmers from Shandong
21st-century Chinese people